Anolis rivalis, the neighbor anole, is a species of lizard in the family Dactyloidae. The species is found in Colombia.

References

Anoles
Reptiles described in 1984
Endemic fauna of Colombia
Reptiles of Colombia
Taxa named by Ernest Edward Williams